Balas & Bolinhos - O Último Capítulo is a 2012 Portuguese action film directed by Luis Ismael.

Plot

Tone, the leader of the gang, returns home after sometime abroad, to try to save his father's life that is on the verge of death, and needs a liver transplant to survive. For this task he needs the help of his gang, once again.

Cast
 Jorge Neto - Rato
 Luís Ismael - Tone
 J.D. Duarte - Culatra
 João Pires - Bino
 Fernando Rocha - Faísca

References

External links 

2012 action films
Portuguese action films
2010s Portuguese-language films